VertigoXmedia is a developer of broadcast graphics automation software and real-time character generators. The company's products and services were used by broadcasters for live TV productions, such as live news, sporting events such as the Super Bowl, and special events such as elections. VertigoXmedia is based in Montreal, Quebec, Canada.

In April 2006 Miranda Technologies Inc. purchased VertigoXmedia.

Software companies of Canada